Gorgabad may refer to:
 Gorgabad, Ardabil
 Gorgabad, Kerman
 Gorgabad, West Azerbaijan